The Euthanasia Coaster is a hypothetical steel roller coaster designed as a euthanasia device to kill its passengers. The concept was conceived in 2010 and made into a scale model by Lithuanian artist Julijonas Urbonas, a PhD candidate at the Royal College of Art in London. Urbonas, who has experience as an amusement park employee, stated that the goal of his concept roller coaster is to take lives "with elegance and euphoria". As for practical applications of his design, Urbonas mentioned "euthanasia" or "execution". John Allen, who served as president of the Philadelphia Toboggan Company, inspired Urbonas with his description of the "ultimate" roller coaster as one that "sends out 24 people and they all come back dead".

Design
The concept design of the layout begins with a steep-angled lift that takes riders up  to the top, a climb that takes a few minutes to reach. Each inversion would have a smaller diameter than the one before in order to maintain the lethal 10 g to passengers while the train loses speed. After a sharp right-hand turn the train would enter a straight, where unloading of corpses and loading of new passengers could take place.

Mechanism of action

The Euthanasia Coaster would kill its passengers through prolonged cerebral hypoxia, or insufficient supply of oxygen to the brain. The ride's seven inversions would inflict 10 g (g-force) on its passengers for 60 seconds – causing g-force related symptoms starting with gray out through tunnel vision to black out and eventually g-LOC (g-force induced loss of consciousness). Subsequent inversions or another run of the coaster would serve as insurance against unintentional survival of more robust passengers.

Exhibition
Urbonas's concept drew media attention when shown as part of the HUMAN+ display at the Science Gallery in Dublin from April through June 2011. The display, designated as its 2011 'flagship exhibition' by the Science Gallery, aims to show the future of humans and technology. Within this theme, the Euthanasia Coaster highlights the issues that come with life extension. The item was also displayed at HUMAN+ exhibit at Centre de Cultura Contemporània de Barcelona in 2015.

Popular culture
In 2012, Norwegian rock group Major Parkinson released "Euthanasia Roller Coaster", a digital single with lyrics alluding to Urbonas's Euthanasia Coaster.

Lavie Tidhar's short story "Vladimir Chong Chooses to Die" incorporates Urbonas's Euthanasia Coaster into the ending.

Glenn Paton's short film H Positive explores the motivations of a wealthy man who, upon discovering that he is dying, commissions an architect to build a Euthanasia Coaster identical to Urbonas's design.  Although Urbonas is not mentioned during the film, the end credits affirm that the film was based on Urbonas's project.

The novelist and short story writer David Leo Rice wrote a story called The Painless Euthanasia Coaster for Catapult Magazine.

The novelist Laura Maylene Walter wrote a story for Washington Square Review that uses the idea of a euthanasia coaster. 

Author Amanda Saint wrote a flash fiction called Golden Glow which tells the story of people in the queue to get on the Euthanasia Coaster, and cites it as her inspiration for the story.

Sequoia Nagamatsu's novel How High We Go in the Dark includes a chapter that features a euthanasia theme park for terminally-ill children, where a final roller coaster kills them before the plague does. Nagamatsu has noted Urbonas’ design as initial inspiration in interviews.

References

External links

Computer animated simulation of the ride
Urbonas explaining his design

2010 works
conceptual art
euthanasia
execution methods
Lithuanian inventions
suicide methods